The United States occupation of the Mexican port of Veracruz lasted for seven months in 1914 and occurred in the midst of poor diplomatic relations between Mexico and the United States, related to the ongoing Mexican Revolution.

In response to the Tampico Affair, President Woodrow Wilson ordered the U.S. Navy to prepare for the occupation of the port of Veracruz. While waiting for authorization of Congress to carry out such action, Wilson was alerted to a German delivery of weapons for Victoriano Huerta due to arrive to the port on April 21. As a result, Wilson issued an immediate order to seize the port's customs office and confiscate the weaponry.

The Medal of Honor was created during the American Civil War and is the highest military decoration presented by the United States government to a member of its armed forces. The recipient must have distinguished themselves at the risk of their own life above and beyond the call of duty in action against an enemy of the United States. Due to the nature of this medal, it is commonly presented posthumously.

Secretary of the Navy Josephus Daniels ordered that 56 Medals of Honor be awarded to participants in the occupation of Veracruz, the most for any single action before or since. In total 63 Medals of Honor were received for actions during the occupation; 1 Army, 9 to members of the United States Marine Corps and 53 to Navy personnel.

Recipients
Note: Notes in quotations are derived or are copied from the official Medal of Honor citation

Notes

References

Veracruz